MPEG Video Wizard DVD, also known as MVW-DVD, is a non-linear video editing software developed by Womble Multimedia, Inc.. It allows users to edit video content, create DVDs with menus and then burn them without the need for any additional software.

Features
 Multi-track timeline editing
 HD MPEG editing with frame accuracy and smart rendering
 Ad detection and removal
 VOB editing and MP4 export support
 Many special effects and filters
 DVD Reader tool to import DVD video via IFO data.
 Extensible menu templates
 Shrink DVD size to fit onto different media
 DVD and ISO burning
 Export DVDs with nonstandard image format
 Microsoft Windows 7 Support

Supported file formats
 Video: AVI, MPG, MPV, DAT, VOB, VBS, VRO, TS, TP, M2T, MTS, M2TS, WMV, ASF, RM, RMVB.
 Audio: WAV, MP3, MP2, MPA, AC3, WMA.
 Image: BMP, JPEG, GIF, WMF, ICO.

External links

MPEG Video Wizard DVD Review from IXBT
MPEG Video Wizard - Basic Video Editing Guide from Digital-Digest
MPEG Video Wizard DVD Tutorial from Guide-How

Video editing software